Smoky Mountain Speedway is a dirt race track located in Maryville, Tennessee.

History
Smoky Mountain Speedway was built in 1962 and opened during the 1965 racing season. The track was converted into a asphalt track in 1967 only to revert back to a dirt track in 1978.

Racing Events
The track hosts regional and national dirt track events for several sanctioning bodies. The track was used for a NASCAR Grand National Series race with its first one in 1965 and its last one was held in 1971.

References

External links
Smoky Mountain Speedway official website

Buildings and structures in Blount County, Tennessee
Motorsport venues in Tennessee
Tourist attractions in Blount County, Tennessee
Maryville, Tennessee
1962 establishments in Tennessee
Sports venues completed in 1962
NASCAR tracks